Blue Spring State Park is a state park located west of Orange City, Florida, in the United States. The park is a popular tourist destination; available activities include canoeing, SCUBA diving, kayaking, fishing, camping, hiking, wildlife watching, and swimming. The spring in the park (Volusia Blue Spring) is the largest on the St. Johns River. About  of water flow out of Blue Spring into the St. Johns River every day.

History
The spring was visited by botanist John Bartram in 1766.

The spring and surrounding land were acquired by the Weismore family in the mid-19th century and a large plantation-style home built upon a shell mound on the property. The area seemed to be excellent for the cultivation of citrus fruit, and a small railway was built linking Orange City to the dock at Blue Spring. Ultimately, the Florida East Coast Railway was constructed not far from the present-day park. A killing freeze occurred in the 1890s, wiping out area citrus groves and driving the industry south. The Thursbys switched to the tourist trade, taking advantage of the beautiful spring and excellent fishing and hunting opportunities along the St. Johns River.

The park was acquired by the Florida Department of Environmental Protection in 1972 to kick-start its manatee protection program.

Manatee research
Researchers have recorded the life history of individual manatees at Blue Spring since 1978, including births, deaths, and relationships. Manatees migrate to warmer spring water during the colder weather in Florida, and often return to the same spring every year. Manatees are identified by their scar patterns, which they acquire mainly from boat strikes, but also from fishing-line entanglements, cold lesions, and fungal infections. The research data collected, both in person and through live video streaming, comprises one of the world's longest-running and comprehensive manatee databases in existence. Several government agencies partner to maintain a Manatee Individual Photo-Identification System  for the Florida manatee. Identifications by state park rangers and Save the Manatee Club researchers at Blue Spring have contributed a large number of sightings to this database.

Environmental concerns
The increasing number of human visitors and also manatees has increased the environmental load on the spring's ecosystem. Both humans and manatees are creating water pollution, and as a result, more filamentous algae grow in the spring area.

Another environmental problem is the decrease in the natural water supply to the spring due to the groundwater pumping in the nearby cities. As a result, the output of Volusia Blue Spring has fallen over the last decades.

Recreation

Blue Spring State Park has 51 campsites and six cabins that can be rented. The camping area is pet friendly.

The spring runs a few miles long and features a boardwalk that stretches 1/3 of a mile from the St. Johns River to the headspring. All water-related activities are prohibited during manatee season (mid November–March). Qualified SCUBA divers can descend into the spring cave in season. Picnicking is a popular pastime, with multiple pavilions available for groups and scattered picnic tables around the entire park. The park also features volleyball courts and a playground, as well as canoeing, kayaking, and fishing. The old Thursby plantation house is being maintained and has historical displays that visitors can explore. Various wildlife besides manatees can be seen also, including alligators, bears, raccoons, and various species of birds. Hontoon Island State Park is a short paddle down the St. Johns River. Foodservice, stores, and a water-activity rental station are available for supplies

See also
Gilchrist Blue Springs State Park
List of Florida state parks
Spring to Spring Trail

Wildlife gallery

References

External links

Official page at Florida State Parks
Friends of Blue Spring State Park
St. Johns River Watershed and Blue Springs Protection - Florida DEP
Water's Journey: The River Returns - Blue Springs Manatees

State parks of Florida
Springs of Florida
Parks in Volusia County, Florida
Orange City, Florida
Bodies of water of Volusia County, Florida